Henry Godinez is a Cuban-American actor, director, and professor of theatre who is committed to the production of Latino theatre in Chicago. He has also directed and acted in New York City, Kansas City, Indiana, Colorado, Washington D.C., and San Diego. He is the Resident Artistic Associate at the Goodman Theatre, founded and serves as director of their biennial Latino Theater Festival, and has directed and performed in multiple productions at the Goodman. Additionally, he is the co-founder and former artistic director of Teatro Vista, a Latino Theatre company in Chicago.

Background 
Godinez was born on August 4, 1958 in Havana, Cuba, the ninth of ten children in a middle class family. At the time, his parents were worried about the possibility of their children being enlisted in Castro's army. Because of this, the family moved to the United States when Godinez was three years old. A year after the family arrived in the US, they moved and settled in Dallas, Texas. It was during a high school theatre class that his younger sister convinced him to take with her that Godinez became interested in theatre. From this new fascination that was sparked by the class, he went on to take part in rhetoric and declamation competitions, taking first place at a competition in Oklahoma during his junior year of high school. After high school Godinez decided to study theatre in his undergraduate years at the University of Dallas. After graduating in 1980, Godinez worked in an apprenticeship in Louisville at The Actor's Theatre. He then furthered his theatre education by getting an MFA at the University of Wisconsin-Milwaukee's professional theatre training program, all of this fanning the flames that would ignite his career.

Since then, Godinez has worked as an actor, director, and professor of theatre, mainly in Chicago, focusing a lot of his work on Shakespeare and Latino theatre. Playing the role of Stefano in one of his college productions of The Tempest is what made Godinez fall in love with Shakespeare. For him, the attraction to Shakespeare was rooted in the huge characters and their enormous needs and energy. He also found a connection between such texts as The Tempest and One Hundred Years of Solitude, by Gabriel García Márquez. The magic that is present in The Tempest and the magic that can be found in the works of many Latino writers and in Latino cultures all clicked for him.

Godinez's commitment to producing Latino theatre was inspired during his time living in Logan Square. After growing up with predominantly white friends and living in an area where racism wasn't uncommon, being in Logan Square put him in a largely Cuban and Puerto Rican environment. This being his first time living in a Latino neighborhood gave him an awareness of all that came with his visibility in the theatre world, especially that he was representing the Latino community. That, coupled with the frustration of the stereotypical casting of Latino actors as drug dealers, led him to want to work to make a change. In doing so, Godinez also learned more about himself and his culture, as well as Latino culture as a whole. Reflecting upon his past made him aware of interactions with racism that he had not quite picked up on when he was growing up. All of this not only influenced his work, but the way he has raised his two daughters. He encourages them to have friends of all backgrounds and also spoke to them in Spanish as they grew up. He recognizes the importance of exposing them to their own culture and does what he can to preserve that.

Career

Teaching 
As a theatre educator, Godinez has taught at Columbia College Chicago (1994 - 2000) and DePaul University (2000 - 2006). He is currently serving at Northwestern University (2006–present) where he teaches courses in acting and other special topics, such as Latino Theatre and Advanced Shakespeare. During the summer of 2016, Godinez led a Northwestern study abroad program to Havana, Cuba, during which students were able to collaborate with renowned theatre company Teatro Buendía to gain an understanding of the style of Cuban theatre and storytelling, and foster new connections between Cuba and the United States.

Boards 
Godinez serves/has served as a board member for several organizations for Chicago theatre. First and foremost, Godinez is the co-founder and former artistic director (1990 - 1996) of Teatro Vista. While part of the cast of a show at the Goodman Theatre, Godinez was talking with two castmates, Ramiro Carillo and Edward Torres, about all of the plays by Latino playwrights that were not being produced. The three decided that they should be producing the shows themselves, and from there Godinez and Torres founded Teatro Vista. The first production of Chicago's new Latino theatre company was at Pilsen Arts Center (now the National Museum of Mexican Art). Their goal was to bridge the gap between Latino theatre and mainstream, big theatres, as well as the non-Latino communities of Chicago. In addition to Teatro Vista, Godinez has served on the Board of Directors for the Illinois Arts Council Agency, Albany Park Theatre Project, and the Northwestern University Press. He is also the Resident Artistic Associate at the Goodman Theatre after having joined their Artistic Collective in 1997.

Acting 
Godinez has performed on many stages. His first role in Chicago after receiving his graduate degree was in Kabuki Medea (1983) at Wisdom Bridge Theater. Additionally, his love of Shakespeare has led him to play roles in multiple productions at Chicago Shakespeare Theatre: Hamlet, King Lear, Twelfth Night, Much Ado About Nothing, Henry V, Cymbeline, and King John. He also led Notre Dame Shakespeare Festival's 2014 production of Henry IV. Godinez's Goodman Theatre credits include Romeo and Juliet (1988), A Christmas Carol (1988), The Rover (1989), Massacre (Sing to your Children) (2007), 2666 (2016),  and a co-production of Pedro Páramo (2013) with Teatro Buendía. Additional stage credits include Quixote: On the Conquest of Self (2017) at the Writers Theatre, as well as having performed at the Kennedy Center and the Old Globe Theatre.

In addition to acting on stage, Godinez has also found roles on screen. In the realm of film and television he has appeared in Above the Law (1988), The Beast (1988), The Package (1989), The Fugitive (1993), Boss, The Chicago Code, (2011), Empire, and Chicago Fire.

Directing 
Although Godinez got into theatre through acting, his truest love for theatre comes from the collaborative process of directing. He has directed numerous productions throughout his career, having worked at such venues as Oak Park Festival Theatre (Macbeth), WBEZ Chicago Public Radio, Signature Theatre Company in New York City (Urban Zulu Mambo, 2001), Kansas Repertory Theatre (The Winter's Tale, 2002), Indiana Repertory Theatre, Colorado Shakespeare Festival (Romeo and Juliet, 1997), and Portland Center Stage (True West, 2002). However, much of his work has been in Chicago. At the Goodman Theatre alone Godinez has directed Cloud Tectonics (1995) in co-production with Teatro Vista; six of the annual productions of A Christmas Carol (1996 - 2001); Straight as a Line (1998); Millennium Mambo (2000); Zoot Suit (2000); Electricidad (2004); Mariela in the Desert (2005); The Cook (2007); Boleros for the Disenchanted (2009), which he also directed in its world premiere at Yale Repertory Theatre; The Sins of Sor Juana (2010); and Feathers and Teeth (2015).

At Teatro Vista, Godinez has directed Broken Eggs (1991), The Crossing (1991), Journey of the Sparrows (1996), Santos and Santos (1996), and El Paso Blue (1997).

Other Chicago productions Godinez has directed include Two Sisters and a Piano (2004) at Apple Tree Theatre; Anna in the Tropics (2005) at Victory Gardens Theatre; Esperanza Rising (2008), A Year With Frog and Toad (2013), and Last Stop on Market Street (2018), all three at Chicago Children's Theatre; A Civil War Christmas (2010) at Northlight Theatre; and End Days (2015) at Windy City Playhouse. Godinez's university directing credits include Water By the Spoonful (2014) at University of Chicago's Court Theatre, as well as Anna in the Tropics (2016) and In the Red and Brown Water (2017), both at Northwestern University's Josephine Louis Theatre.

Publications 
Godinez is co-editor of The Goodman Theatre's Festival Latino: Six Plays (2013) and has written for Latino USA.

Awards 
Godinez has been award the TCG Alan Schneider Directing Award (1999), the Distinguished Service Award by the Lawyers for the Creative Arts (2000), the Latino Professional of the Year Award by Chicago Latino Network (2008), and the Clarence Simon Award for Teaching and Mentoring (2013).

References 

1958 births
Living people
American people of Cuban descent
Cuban film directors
Cuban male film actors
Cuban male stage actors
Male actors from Havana
20th-century Cuban male actors
21st-century Cuban male actors